The systems of secondary and post-secondary education in Kolkata are listed as follows:

Schooling

Kolkata has several parallel systems of school education, and K-12 schools are usually affiliated with either of the following:

In addition to these, private candidates can appear for examinations of either the CBSE, West Bengal boards and other state boards which conduct their courses in the city.

Non-privileged children mainly attend government primary schools, if they attend school at all. The quality of education available in these schools is not, by world standards, good. There have been recent initiatives, such as Shikhshalaya Prakalpa, to bring more children into the school system and improve the quality of teaching.

Universities
Kolkata has twenty public universities or autonomous institutions that award their own degrees or diplomas. The following list contains the names of the degree or diploma awarding institutions that have their main campuses in or around Kolkata:

Engineering colleges
Three of India's oldest engineering institutions are located in Kolkata namely IIEST, Shibpur, Marine Engineering and Research Institute and Jadavpur University. The University of Calcutta and Jadavpur University have been declared as "university with potential for excellence (UPE)" by the University Grants Commission. Self-aided engineering colleges started to function in the late 1990s. All self-aided engineering colleges of the city are affiliated to the West Bengal University of Technology. Some engineering colleges are funded by the World Bank under the "Technical Education Quality Improvement Program".  The University of Calcutta, Aliah University and Techno India University also offer engineering courses. The Indian Institute of Technology Kharagpur, the Birla Institute of Technology, and Jnan Chandra Ghosh Polytechnic also offer technology and related courses in their city based campuses.

Medical and dental colleges 
All colleges are affiliated with the West Bengal University of Health Sciences, Kolkata. 
Calcutta Medical College
Calcutta National Medical College
Nil Ratan Sarkar Medical College and Hospital
R.G.Kar Medical College
IPGMER and SSKM Hospital
College of Medicine & Sagore Dutta Hospital
KPC Medical College and Hospital
Dr. R. Ahmed Dental College and Hospital
Guru Nanak Institute of Dental Science and Research

Institutions of national importance 

Indian Institute of Engineering Science and Technology, Shibpur 
Asiatic Society
Bose Institute 
Indian Statistical Institute
Indian Institute of Management Calcutta
Marine Engineering and Research Institute
Indian Association for the Cultivation of Science
Indian Institute of Science Education and Research, Kolkata 
Indian Institute of Chemical Biology
Variable Energy Cyclotron Centre 
Saha Institute of Nuclear Physics 
S.N. Bose National Centre for Basic Sciences

References